Union for Democracy and the Republic is the name of several African political parties:
Union for Democracy and the Republic (Niger), a political party in Niger
Union for Democracy and the Republic (Congo), a political party in the Republic of the Congo
Union for Democracy and the Republic (Chad), a political party in Chad
Union for Democracy and the Republic (Algeria), a former political party in Algeria